The following details the Uzbekistan national football team results in "International "B" Matches" and were not accorded the status of official International A Matches.

Non-International matches

UZB 4 - 1 THA in 3*30 minutes

See also
 Uzbekistan national football team
 Uzbekistan national football team results – 1990s
 Uzbekistan national football team results – 2000s
 Uzbekistan national football team results – 2010s

Football in Uzbekistan
Unofficial
Lists of national association football team unofficial results